Gasbag may refer to:

Balloon, a bag filled with gas
Hot air balloon for manned flight uses a fabric gas bag or "lifting envelope".
Gas bladder, contributes to the ability of a fish to control its buoyancy

See also
Gasbags, 1941 British comedy film